Mordellistena micantoides is a species of beetle in genus Mordellistena of the family Mordellidae. It was discovered in 1954.

References

micantoides
Beetles described in 1854
Endemic fauna of Germany